Palaeotype is a monotypic moth genus in the family Erebidae erected by George Hampson in 1918. Its single species, Palaeotype submarginata, was first described by Walter Rothschild in 1915. It is found in Papua New Guinea.

References

Nudariina
Monotypic moth genera
Moths described in 1915
Moths of New Guinea